Pimenteiras do Oeste is a municipality located in the Brazilian state of Rondônia. Its population was 2,148 (2020) and its area is 6,015 km².

The municipality contains 52% of the  Corumbiara State Park, created in 1990.

References

Municipalities in Rondônia